Somananda (875–925 CE) was one of the teachers of Kashmir Shaivism, in the lineage of Trayambaka, author of the first philosophical treatise of this school, Śivadṛṣṭi. A contemporary of Bhaṭṭa Kallaṭa, the two formed the first wave of Kashmiri Shaivites to propose in a rigorous and logical way the concepts of nondual Shaivism. Somananda lived in Kashmir, most probably in Srinagar, where most of the later philosophers of the school lived, as a householder.

Lineage

There is considerable myth surrounding the origins of Somananda. He claimed he was a descendant of the sage Durvasa. Durvasa received from Shiva the spiritual mission of keeping the tradition and secrets of Agamic Shaivism alive. It is said that Durvasa created his son, Tryambaka, directly from the mind (in a similar way with the creation of Athena directly from the mind of her father, Zeus, in the Greek mythology). In turn, Tryambaka also created a son directly from his mind. This went on for 15 generation terminating with the father of Sangamaditya, who took a woman as a wife. Then, there were three more generations until Somananda. So, Somananda claims a divine spiritual ancestry and investiture.

Somananda was also the disciple of Vasugupta, another important Shaivite master. Vasugupta was the author of Shiva Sutra, one of the fundamental texts of nondual Shaivism. Bhatta Kallata, the author of Spanda Karika, was contemporary with Somananda and had also been a disciple of Vasugupta. Thus, from Vasugupta emerged two disciples, Somananda and Bhatta Kallata, each proposing a school of monistic Shaivism, Pratyabhijna and respectively Spanda.

The difference between the texts we have left from these rival disciples is mainly in their scope, not in essence. While Somananda's Sivadristi has a philosophical bent, Bhatta Kallata's Spanda Karika is more practical and shorter in length.

Somananda main disciple was Utpaladeva. Utpaladeva wrote a number of texts to continue and develop his teacher's work including the Īśvarapratyabhijñākārikā, of which Abhinavagupta's Īśvarapratyābhijñāvimarśinī is a commentary. Utpaladeva also commented on his teacher's work, Sivadṛṣṭi. Following Utpaladeva came Lakshmanagupta, and then Abhinavagupta, who was the epitome of the Kashmiri Shaivism. Abhinavagupta took teachings from all the schools of Shaivism and was said to reach spiritual liberation himself, after which he took on the huge undertaking of uniting all these schools into one coherent system. Abhinavagupta's main work is Tantraloka.

Philosophy

Based on his writings it is supposed Somananda attained the highest spiritual realization. From such a position of deep understanding and insight he compiled his texts based on logic. He had minute attention for detail and a great capacity to express in clear terms even the most difficult points. When debating opposing views, he makes  an effort to understand exactly what they are and present them in his work, then refute them by subtle logic.

Somananda was a householder and his system is to be applied by people in the midst of everyday life. He rejected practices which required reclusion and leaving behind of society.

Somananda is mainly remembered as the first perceptor of the Pratyabhijna school. He defined the theoretical aspects of Pratyabhijna in his main work Sivadristi. His son, Utpaladeva refined and developed it, leaving the task of bringing it to completion and integrating it with the other schools of Kashmir Shaivism to the great master Abhinavagupta.

His philosophy is both idealistic-monism and theistic.
In essence, he states that Everything is Shiva. Besides being "all-things", Shiva is also cit-ananda - consciousness and bliss. He is in possession of an absolutely free will, Svatantrya, with which he creates the manifestation without the use of any external instruments or materials. He manifests through his powers of knowledge and action.

The notion of Svatantrya is central to Somananda's philosophy. The free-will of Shiva is manifested as energy, called Shakti, which emanates from Shiva himself and is the stuff from which the world is created, thus, being ontologically anterior to the world, it is beyond any obstacles. When Shakti begins the process of manifestation it subdivides into a number of ontological categories or substances called tattvas, 36 in number. Thus, the world is considered real (not illusory, as in other monistic idealistic spiritual schools).

The written work of Somananda contains more than philosophical system building. It also contains an account of the rival schools of philosophy and a series of refutations based on logic. For example, Somananda disagrees with the gross realism of the Nyaya-Vaisesika system, the subtle realism of Samkhya, and the idealism of Vedanta, or that of Vijnanavada of Buddhism. In his view, the universe is an appearance, but not of Maya (illusion) but of the free will of Shiva. In reality the universe is Shiva himself. Instead of postulating a principle of beginning-less ignorance avidya like Advaita Vedanta, he points out that it is though the free-will of Shiva, Svatantriya, that ignorance appears. Ignorance is not an ontological reality but an epistemological phenomenon.

Works

Somananda was the author of the first philosophical treatise on monistic Saivism, Sivadristi, a work in seven chapters. It starts by describing the eternal nature of Shiva and the creation of the universe. The author exposes his theory of non-differentiation, unity of subject and object, everything being of the nature of consciousness, cid-rupa. A large portion of the book is dedicated to the exposition, analysis and critique of the Vivarta theory of the grammarians, the Shakta approach to the ultimate reality, the Vijnanavadin nuanced differences with respect to the principle of monism, the Advaita Vedanta concept of ignorance and the fundamental principles of all the other major spiritual schools of the time. In the end Somananda describes the history of Kashmiri Shaivism and of his own family. Other texts by Somananda include a commentary on his own Sivadristi and on Paratrimsika Vivarana.

References

External links
 Bibliography of Somananda's works, Item 466, Karl Potter, University of Washington

Kashmiri writers
875 births
925 deaths
Hindu denominations
Kashmiri Shaivites
Theistic Indian philosophy